The Gyeyul ( and Yul jong 律宗, or Vinaya in Sanskrit) school, founded by the Korean monk Gyeomik who went to India in 526 CE to learn Sanskrit and study the Vinaya, is the Korean name applied to a branch of Buddhism that specializes in the study and implementation of śīla (yuljang 律藏) the "moral discipline" or ""Buddhist ethics". It derives directly from the Indian Vinaya School. Gyeomik went to India from Baekje to study the trepitaka vedatta at "Sangana Vinaya Temple", translated the text into a book called "yulmun" in Korea, and transmitted the Sanskrit from India to Korea. When Baekje, which is one of the Three Kingdoms of Korea, the translated text and the Gyeyul monastic order were lost. 

Vinaya monk Jajang  (590–658 CE), born in Silla as a true bone (jin'gol) aristocrat, revived the Gyeyul order  and built the Woljeongsa temple in 643 of Jogye Order of Korean Buddhism on the eastern slopes of Odaesan in Pyeongchang County. In 641 CE, Jajang and his disciple Seungsil travelled to Tang dynasty China where he received bone relic of Buddha's crown, Śarīra relics and an honorary robe. He also visited Yunju Temple where he stayed until his return to Silla in 643 CE.

History 

When Buddhism first came to Baekje in 384, it was introduced by a Serindian monk named Marananta, Buddhism was quickly embraced but largely unknown.  So, a Korean monk named Gyeomik (겸익, 謙益) was sent to India to bring back more information.  He is said to have traveled to India via the southern seas, studied Sanskrit and then came back to Baekje accompanied by another Indian monk, Paedalta (Vedatta?) and with many texts on the Vinaya and Abhidharma.   Gyeomik translated these texts into Korean along with help from his disciples Tamuk and Hyerin and thus founded the Vinaya School in Korea.

See also
 Silk Road transmission of Buddhism
 Buddhism in Korea
 Dhyānabhadra
 Jajang 
 Jogye Order 
 Marananta
 Sangha
 śīla 
 Śarīra 
 Tongdosa 
 Vinaya

Notes

Schools of Buddhism founded in Korea